Museum Tower may refer to:
Museum Tower (Dallas), Texas
Museum Tower (Miami), Florida
Museum Tower (Charlotte), North Carolina
Pinnacle Marina Tower, formerly the Pinnacle Museum Tower in San Diego, California